Magnus Norman was the defending champion and successfully defended his title by defeating Sjeng Schalken 6–4, 4–6, 6–3 in the final.

Seeds

Draw

Finals

Top half

Bottom half

External links
 Main draw (ATP)
 Qualifying draw (ATP)

Kingfisher Airlines Tennis Open
2000 ATP Tour